The Yemeni Republican Guard, formerly called the  Strategic Reserve Forces between 2013 and 2016, was an elite formation of the Yemen Army. It was formerly commanded by the former President Ali Abdullah Saleh's son, Ahmed Saleh. It was most notably involved in the 2011 Yemeni uprising, fighting in favour of the Saleh government. The unit was traditionally relied on as the backbone of the regime, and the unit was the best armed and trained in the armed forces. The Defence Ministry both overlooked and engaged in corruption with the unit in order to ensure the loyalty of the unit's leadership.

History 

The Republican Guard was raised in 1964 by Yemen's Republican and Nasserist regime based on the Egyptian Republican Guard model of a powerful, heavily armored formation defending the capital city against internal threats. The Guard was initially created and trained by Egyptian and Soviet advisors. The Guard was supposed to be a symbol of the Republican State. Recruits were mostly drawn from the Hajjah and 'Amran Governorates. Each Battalion had a Chief Political Commissar with a deputy in every company, squadron and battery for political education of troops. The commissar was responsible only to the Brigade Commander and not to the Battalion commander.

Role in the 2011-2012 Yemeni revolution 
On 15 October 2011, Al Arabiya, quoting defected General Ali Mohsen al-Ahmar, reported that 7,000 members of the Republican Guard and other security units had defected to the Yemeni opposition.

On November 21, anti-government forces stormed a Republican Guard barracks situated in Nahm, a town 70 km northeast of the capital Sana'a. The barracks attacked was used by the 63rd Mountain Infantry Brigade of the Republican Guard. Planes loyal to the regime of Saleh launched several retaliatory strikes against the anti-government forces, who returned anti-aircraft fire using captured base equipment.

Post revolution 
Although the Republican Guard under Saleh was counted as one of the most loyal units of the Yemeni Army, the unit has been less reliable for his successor due to parts of it still being commanded by Saleh loyalists. This has led to conflict in the unit between Saleh loyalists and loyalists to the new government.

Following an attempt by the new President Abdrabbuh Mansur Hadi to replace the leader of the 3rd Republican Guard Brigade, Tareq Saleh, Saleh led a 65-day mutiny. The mutiny was eventually brought to an end on June 7 after other Republican Guard Brigades managed to disarm the mutinous Brigade. Saleh subsequently relinquished his command and control of the 3rd Brigade, which is regarded as one of the strongest and best equipped brigades in the military, was taken over by General Abdulrahman al-Halili.

Another Saleh loyalist, Brigadier General Murad al-Awbali, commander of the 62nd brigade, was abducted by soldiers in the unit after withholding pay from those who had broken ranks with the former president Saleh. Awbali's release was later secured by tribal officials.

In an effort to try to curb the power of Brig. Gen. Ahmed Saleh, President Hadi announced a restructuring of the Armed Forces in early August 2012. The restructuring particularly hit the strong Republican Guard, and will see units moved from both the Republican Guard and other units to a new force known as the Presidential Defence Forces, which will be under the direct control of the president. In reaction to these attempts at restructuring, 200 armed members of the Republican Guard protested outside the Defense Ministry, leading to troops being deployed due to worry that the armed protesters might attempt to storm the building. After Saleh's death, Republican Guard forces reportedly started fighting against the Houthis, capturing many areas in Al Hudaydah city. The Yemeni republican guard and the central security forces have joined to form the 'guardians of the republic' which is Tareq Saleh's private army. They are highly experienced veterans and are reportedly the best equipped and trained forces in the Saudi coalition.

Strength
30,000 to 100,000 men commanded by Brigadier Ahmed Saleh.

Organization
The RG command structure in April 2012 The Republican Guard consists of 20 Brigades:
 1st Brigade (Special Guard)
 1st Artillery Brigade (SCUD Missile)
 2nd Mountain Infantry Brigade
 3rd Mountain Infantry Brigade
 3rd Armoured Brigade
 4th Artillery Brigade (Field)
 7th Infantry Brigade
 9th Mechanized Infantry Brigade
 14th Armored Brigade
 22nd Armored Brigade
 26th Artillery Brigade (Rocket)
 33rd Armored Brigade
 55th Special Forces ' Brigade
 61st Artillery Brigade (Self-Propelled)
 62nd Mountain Infantry Brigade
 63rd Mechanized Infantry Brigade
 72nd Infantry Brigade
 83rd Artillery Brigade (Field)
 101st Mountain Infantry Brigade
 102nd Mountain Infantry Brigade

This organization was changed in 2015, just before the outbreak of the Yemeni Civil War.

See also
 Republican guard

References

Military of Yemen
Guards regiments
Organizations of the Yemeni Crisis (2011–present)
Yemeni Civil War (2014–present)